The Eisner Award for Best U.S. Edition of International Material is an award for "creative achievement" in American comic books for material not originally published or available in the United States of America.

History and name change

The award was named Best U.S. Edition of Foreign Material from that award's inception in 1998 to 2006. In 2007 the award was split into Best U.S. Edition of International Material and Best U.S. Edition of International Material–Japan (renamed in 2010 to Best U.S. Edition of International Material—Asia).

Winners and nominees

See also
 Eisner Award for Best U.S. Edition of International Material—Asia
 Eisner Award for Best Publication for Early Readers
 Eisner Award for Best Academic/Scholarly Work

Notes

References

Category
1998 establishments in the United States
Annual events in the United States
Awards established in 1998
U.S. Edition of International Material